Noble Consort Zheng (1565–1630), was a Ming dynasty concubine of the Wanli Emperor. She is known for having been his most beloved consort and, in an attempt to please her, he tried to make her son his heir apparent. This act caused over a decade of conflict and factionalism in the imperial court.

Early life
Zheng was born in Daxing District of southern Beijing in 1565. In 1581, the imperial court opened selections for the emperor's harem and Zheng was selected.

Imperial life
Soon after arrival in the imperial harem, Zheng was elevated to the status of Imperial Concubine with the honorific name Shu (淑). Her father was made a member of the Jinyiwei, with authority over 1,000 households. In 1582, Zheng was given the rank of Virtuous Consort and her father was awarded a command.

In January 1584, the Wanli Emperor ordered the Ministry of Rites to confer the rank of Noble Consort upon Zheng, to celebrate the birth of the Princess Yunhe. The Wanli Emperor also gave his seneschal 100,000 silver taels to organise celebrations. In 1585, Zheng gave birth to the emperor's second son. The child died soon after birth and was given the posthumous title Prince Ai of Bin. In early 1586, she gave birth to another son, named Zhu Changxun. 
In 1589, Zheng's one-year-old daughter Zhu Xuanyao died. She was posthumously given the title Princess Lingqiu.

Zheng died in 1630. She was entombed at Yinquan Mountain within the Ming Tombs, but in the area for imperial consorts.

Succession dispute 
In 1586, Zheng was pregnant and the emperor decreed that she should be made Imperial Noble Consort. His advisers argued that doing so was not appropriate, as this would raise her in status above Consort Gong, who had given birth to the emperor's eldest son. This was widely perceived as a precursor to the emperor declaring Zheng's son, Zhu Changxun, heir apparent, skipping over his eldest son by Gong. Officials argued that, if Zheng were to be made Imperial Noble Consort, then the emperor should simultaneously elevate Gong to Noble Consort. The emperor, however, rejected his officials advice.

Over the succeeding decade, the emperor's officials also attempted to persuade him that abandoning the tradition of primogeniture had made Zheng the object of anger and disgust, not only in the court, but also across the country.

Finally, the emperor declared his eldest son heir apparent in 1601 and gave Zhu Changxun the title Prince of Fu (福). However, he was not made to leave the imperial court in keeping with tradition until 1614, when Zhu's household moved to Luoyang. From 1613, the Wanli Emperor had persisted in making his disapproval of Zhu Changluo evident by preventing the burial of Crown Princess Guo in a manner befitting a crown princess — she was finally interred in 1615, after Noble Consort Zheng's son left the palace. Zhu was killed by Li Zicheng in 1641.

Titles 
During the reign of the Jiajing Emperor (r. 1521–1567):
Lady Zheng  (鄭氏; from 1565)
During the reign of the Wanli Emperor (r. 1572–1620):
Imperial Concubine Shu (淑嬪; from 6 March 1582)
Consort De (德妃; from 26 July 1583)
Noble Consort Zheng (鄭貴妃; from 7 August 1584)
During the reign of the Chongzhen Emperor (r. 1627–1644)
Imperial Noble Consort Gongke Ruirong Hejing (恭恪惠荣和靖皇贵妃; from 1630)
During the reign of the Hongguang Emperor (r. 1644–1645)
Grand Empress Dowager Xiaoning Wenmu Zhuanghui Ciyi Xiantian Yusheng (孝宁温穆庄惠慈懿宪天裕圣太皇太后; from 1644)

Issue 
As Consort De:
Princess Yunhe (雲和公主; 1584–1590), personal name Xuanshu (軒姝), the Wanli Emperor's second daughter
As Noble Consort Zheng:
Zhu Changxu, Prince Ai of Bin (邠哀王 朱常溆; 19 January 1585), the Wanli Emperoe's second son
Zhu Changxun, Prince Zhong of Fu (福忠王 朱常洵; 22 February 1586 – 2 March 1641), the Wanli Empero's third son
Zhu Changzhi, Prince Hai of Yuan (沅懷王 朱常治; 10 October 1587 – 5 September 1588), the Wanli Emperor's fourth son
Princess Lingqiu (靈丘公主; 1588–1589), personal name Xuanyao (軒姚), the Wanli Emperor's sixth daughter
Princess Shouning (壽寧公主; 1592–1634), personal name Xuanwei (軒媁), the Wanli Emperor's seventh daughter

Media
Portrayed by Ma Yili in the 2005 Chinese television series Jing Yiwei
Portrayed by Chen Hao in the 2007 Chinese television series Emperor My Second
Portrayed by Seo Yoon-ah in the 2015 South Korean television series The Jingbirok: A Memoir of Imjin War

References

Notes

Works cited

1565 births
1630 deaths
Ming dynasty imperial consorts
Ming dynasty posthumous empresses
16th-century Chinese women
16th-century Chinese people
17th-century Chinese women
17th-century Chinese people
People from Beijing